U.S. Route 1 (US 1) is a north–south U.S. Route is the U.S. state of New Hampshire through Hampton and Portsmouth. It lies between Interstate 95 (I-95) and New Hampshire Route 1A (NH 1A).

Route description

History

US 1 follows the historic Lafayette Road through New Hampshire, named after the Gilbert du Motier, Marquis de Lafayette, who passed over the road in 1825.

For a period of time during the 1950s, a segment of US 1 in Massachusetts and New Hampshire was routed onto what later became I-95. Roadway that had been US 1 was designated as Route 17 from Danvers to Salisbury and NH 17 for a short distance in Seabrook. Once the I-95 designation was adopted, Route 17 and NH 17 were restored to being US 1.

Memorial Bridge replacement

The original Memorial Bridge, which formerly carried US 1 over the Piscataqua River between New Hampshire and Maine, was closed to motorists in July 2011 due to numerous safety and structural concerns. This was a permanent closure following two instances in 2009 and 2010 when the bridge was closed for emergency repairs. The bridge was, however, left open to pedestrians and bicyclists, as it was the only of the three river bridges allowing for these methods of travel. On January 9, 2012, the bridge was closed to pedestrians and cyclists as well. The middle lift section was removed on February 8, leaving a  gap in US 1.

Over the next two years, the bridge was demolished and removed, and a new drawbridge was constructed in its place. In the interim, access to US 1 on each side of the gap was facilitated by either the Sarah Mildred Long Bridge, which carries US 1 Bypass (US 1 Byp.), or the Piscataqua River Bridge which carries I-95. The New Hampshire Department of Transportation operated hourly shuttle service between Portsmouth and Kittery while the new bridge was constructed.

The new bridge was officially dedicated at a ceremony on the New Hampshire side of the span just before noon on August 8, 2013. Former Portsmouth Mayor Eileen Foley cut the red ribbon, 90 years after she performed the same honors for the original span in 1923 when she was five years old. The bridge initially opened to only pedestrians and bicyclists. The new bridge—constructed over two previously existing piers—opened to vehicular traffic at 2:00 pm first with southbound traffic (Maine to New Hampshire), then northbound. Finishing work on the bridge was completed in late 2013.

Major intersections

Auxiliary routes

U.S. Route 1 Bypass 

U.S. Route 1 Bypass (US 1 Byp.) is a  bypass of US 1 in Portsmouth and Kittery, Maine. The southern terminus is at US 1 (Lafayette Road) just south of downtown. The highway continues northwest to the traffic circle, where it then turns northeast. US 1 Byp. crosses the Sarah Mildred Long Bridge and continues into Kittery, Maine.

New Hampshire Route 1A

New Hampshire Route 1A (NH 1A) is an  auxiliary of US 1 which runs along the Atlantic coastline. It runs from the Massachusetts border north to Rye, then turns toward downtown Portsmouth. The southern terminus of NH 1A is at the state line in Seabrook where it continues south as Route 1A. The northern terminus is at the junction with US 1 (Lafayette Road) in Portsmouth. For the length of the road’s run along the shore, its local name is Ocean Boulevard. In Portsmouth, it is known as Miller Avenue and Sagamore Avenue.

New Hampshire Route 1B

New Hampshire Route 1B (NH 1B) is a  auxiliary of US 1 serving the town of New Castle.

The southern terminus is at NH 1A in Portsmouth, near the city's southeastern boundary. The road loops around over Great Island in the Piscataqua River through New Castle and then back into downtown Portsmouth. The northern terminus is at the junction with US 1 at Prescott Park, near the Maine state line. The highway is signed north–south but forms a half-loop for most of its route.Due to US 1 being routed onto the Memorial Bridge adjacent to the intersection with NH 1B, traffic from NH 1B must loop around State Street and Harbor Place to access US 1 in either direction. Harbor Place defaults onto Daniel Street, which carries US 1 south into Market Square. A hard left onto Wight Avenue will cross over to US 1 north to Maine. Southbound traffic on US 1 must use Chapel and State streets to access NH 1B.

Junction list

See also

Related routes
 U.S. Route 1 Bypass, a mostly-freeway bypass of downtown Portsmouth
 New England Interstate Route 1, the designation of US 1 prior to 1926

References

External links

 U.S. Route 1 in New Hampshire on Flickr
 U.S. Route 1 Bypass on Flickr
 New Hampshire State Route 1A on Flickr
 New Hampshire State Route 1B on Flickr

01
 1 New Hampshire
Transportation in Rockingham County, New Hampshire